Kim Paffenroth (born 1966) is an American religious scholar, professor, and contemporary American horror author, best known for his Bram Stoker Award-winning book Gospel of the Living Dead: George Romero’s Visions of Hell on Earth.

Biography 
Kim Paffenroth was born in 1966 in Syosset, New York. He attended Broad Run High School and Los Alamos High School. He received a BA from St. John's College in Annapolis, Maryland, an STM from Harvard Divinity School, and a PhD The University of Notre Dame. After teaching at Villanova University and University of Notre Dame, Paffenroth began teaching at Iona College, where he is a Professor of Religious Studies. He is the author of numerous books on the Bible, theology, and pop culture, as well as a series of zombie-themed genre fiction. His book Gospel of the Living Dead: George Romero’s Visions of Hell on Earth won the Bram Stoker Award in the non-fiction category.

Paffenroth is married and has two children.

Books
Gospel of the Living Dead: George Romero’s Visions of Hell on Earth (2006), Baylor
Dying to Live: A Novel of Life Among the Undead
Dying to Live: Life Sentence
Dying to Live: Last Rites
Valley of the Dead: The Truth Behind Dante's Inferno
Judas: Images of the Lost Disciple

References

External links
Kim Paffenroth's Official Blog

American horror writers
Harvard Divinity School alumni
University of Notre Dame alumni
Villanova University faculty
1966 births
Living people
St. John's College (Annapolis/Santa Fe) alumni
Iona University people